Paul Smith (born January 31, 1978) is a former American football player. He was drafted in the fifth round of the 2000 NFL Draft. He currently owns Get Lifted CrossFit in El Paso, Texas.

High school years
Smith attended Andress high school in El Paso, Texas and was a student and a letterman in football. In football, he was an El Paso All-Star selection and an All-District selection. Paul Smith graduated from Andress High School in 1996.

1978 births
Living people
Players of American football from El Paso, Texas
American football fullbacks
UTEP Miners football players
San Francisco 49ers players
Detroit Lions players
St. Louis Rams players
Denver Broncos players